D.I.O. Drogist (abbreviated Dutch Drogisten Inkoop Organisatie) is a Dutch pharmacy chain founded in 1992. The company operates over 170 outlets in Dutch towns. In September 2019, the company merged with another Dutch pharmacy company DA, with the DIO stores being re-branded as DA stores.

References

External links
Diodrogist.nl

Pharmacy brands
Retail companies of the Netherlands
Retail companies established in 1992